The National Moldavian Party was a political party in Bessarabia.

History 

Prior to 1917, Bessarabian intelligentsia was divided between noblemen, conservatives, democrats, and socialists. Vasile Stroescu, a rich but very modest filantrop boyar, managed to persuade all major factions to leave internal fights and at four day meeting (–) the National Moldavian Party was created. In April 1917 the party leadership was elected. It was headed by Vasile Stroescu, having among its members Paul Gore (a renowned conservative), Vladimir Herța, Pan Halippa (a renowned socialist), Onisifor Ghibu. Among the leaders of the party were general Matei Donici, Ion Pelivan, Daniel Ciugureanu, Gurie Grosu, Nicolae Alexandri, Teofil Ioncu, P. Grosu, Mihail Minciună, Vlad Bogos, F. Corobceanu, Gheorghe Buruiană, Simeon Murafa, Al. Botezat, Alexandru Groapă, Ion Codreanu, Vasile Gafencu.

The party, which demanded autonomy, had a newspaper called Cuvânt moldovenesc, to which some refugees from Bukovina and Transylvania also contributed. The cornerstone of the National Moldavian Party program was to obtain political, administrative, church, school, and economic autonomy for Bessarabia. They did not hesitate to send members of the respective profession to the various congresses held in Bessarabia throughout 1917, and became very influential.

Ghibu and George Tofan were part of a group of Transylvanian and Bukovinian intellectuals which arrived in Bessarabia in the wake of the February Revolution to help organize schools in Romanian, to print books and newspapers, and to help the Bessarabians in the strife for reorganization of the political and cultural life. Intellectuals from Bukovina, Transylvania, and the Romanian Old Kingdom fleeing the war to Bessarabia, helped with the printing of Cuvânt moldovenesc, started various language, history, culture, and sciences courses, and set up a People's University (Universitatea Populară) in Chişinău.

The party was replaced by the Bessarabian Peasants' Party, founded in Chişinău on 23 August 1918.

See also 
 Sfatul Țării
 Working People's Party (Moldova), formerly known as the "New National Moldovan Party"

Gallery

References 

Defunct political parties in Moldova
Political parties established in 1917
Political parties disestablished in 1918
Romanian nationalist parties
Moldavian Democratic Republic
1917 establishments in Russia
1918 disestablishments in Romania
Political parties of the Russian Revolution